Hydrogenophaga defluvii is a Gram-negative, oxidase-positive, rod-shaped, motile bacterium from the Comamonadaceae family, which was isolated from wastewater. Colonies of H. defluvii are pale yellow in color.

References

External links
Type strain of Hydrogenophaga defluvii at BacDive -  the Bacterial Diversity Metadatabase

Comamonadaceae
Bacteria described in 2005